Sudeshna Roy is an Indian film director, actor and writer based in Tollywood. She started her career as an entertainment journalist before collaborating with the director Abhijit Guha and foraying into the film industry. She is a popular artist in the Bangla Entertainment Industry. Besides directing films, she acted in several films, daily soaps and web series. The duo debuted with their first film Shudhu Tumi, and then they made several films in varied genres. However, they are known to make urban middle-class romantic comedy films. They worked with Abir Chatterjee, who debuted in their film Cross Connection in 2009. They came into prominence after their critically acclaimed film Teen Yaari Kotha. Teen Yaari Katha was showcased in the competition section of Osian's Cinefan Festival of Asian and Arab Cinema in 2012. It travelled to the Bangkok International Film as well as Kolkata International Film Festival. Their film Bapi bari jaa is considered a cult classic among the Bangla film lovers. It also marked the debut of Arjun Chakraborty and MP Mimi Chakraborty in the Bangla film industry.

Their film Jodi Love Dilena Praane  was another well-received film and was selected for the Indian Panorama section of the International Film Festival of India in Goa in 2014. It was showcased at the Pune Film Festival in India and won a certificate of appreciation at the Fiji International Film Festival in 2015.

Benche Thakar Gaan: The Song of Life ran in theatres for the nine weeks and was selected as the inaugural film for the Kolkata International Film Festival film Benche Thakar Gaan 2016. This is the first time in history that a Bengali language film was selected. Their film Sraboner Dhara is a part of the Asian Select Competition Section KIFF 2019, Kolkata. It was showcased in Toronto at the IFFSA fest in May, 2019. Sraboner Dhara was released on 7 February 2020 in India and was running to full houses on its sixth week when the COVID-19 lockdown cut it short.

Films

Short Film/Web Series

 Virgin Mohito (2018)
 Amra 2GayTher (2021)

Television Series (As Director)

Fiction 

 Labonyor Sansar
 Khunje Berai Kachcher Maanush
 Shashuri Zindabad
 Taranath Tantrik
 Kanakanjali

Non Fiction 

 Manabi
 Parama
 Naari

Quiz Programmes 

 Sreemoti Budhdhimoti
 Proshnokhetro
 Checkmate

Children Programmes 

 Dekhbo Aami Jagat Take

Television Series (As Actress)

 Robi Thakurer Golpo (Rabindranath Tagore's stories)
 Deep Jwele Jaay
 Goyenda Ginni
 Sona Roder Gaan
 Maa Tomay Chara Ghum Asena as Jhilik's aunt (later replaced by Sonali Chowdhury)
 Pratidaan as Mrs.Bhaduri
 Ekhane Akash Neel 2 as Dr. Lily Dashgupta   (Hiya's teacher) 
 Alo Chhaya as Anushree and Tanushree's mother
 Mithai as Mrs. Chatterjee (English tutor at Excel English Academy)

Personal life 
Her son Shaket Banerjee is also a film maker. Her daughter-in-law is Antara Mitra, a well known content producer mainly associated with OTT platform addatimes.

Other Important Works 
Since 2017 she has been associated with the West Bengal Commission for Protection of Child Rights as a member, then a special consultant and then from 16th of September 2022 she has been the Chairperson of the Commission.

Awards & Recognitions 

Teen Yaari Katha was showcased in the competition section of Osian's Cinefan Festival of Asian and Arab Cinema in 2012. It travelled to the Bangkok International Film as well as Kolkata International Film Festival.
Jodi Love Dile Na Prane was selected for Indian Panorama Film Festival in Goa in 2014. Official selection in Pune Film Festival and Hyderabad Film Festival. It won the Certificate of Appreciation at Fiji International Film Festival in 2015.
Benche Thakar Gaan : The Song of Life was selected as the inaugural film for the Kolkata International Film Festival 2016. 
Sraboner Dhara  is a part of the Asian Select Competition Section KIFF 2019, Kolkata. It was showcased in Toronto at the IFFSA fest in May, 2019.

References

External links
 
Chalo Let's Live

Bengali actresses
Bengali film directors
Bengali writers
Bengali screenwriters
Screenwriters from Kolkata
Living people
Year of birth missing (living people)
Film directors from Kolkata
Actresses from Kolkata